Rick Leonard (born November 22, 1996) is an American football offensive tackle who is a free agent. He played college football at Florida State, where he started out as a defensive end before moving to offensive tackle. He was drafted by the New Orleans Saints in the fourth round of the 2018 NFL Draft and has since been a member of several other teams.

College career
A four-star recruit, Leonard committed to Florida State in 2014 as a defensive end, over offers from Arizona, Clemson, Maryland,  Pittsburgh, Tennessee, Washington, and Wisconsin, among others. In his freshman season, he played in four games as a reserve. Leonard compiled five tackles and 2.5 tackles for loss as a sophomore and played in all 13 games. After two seasons on defense, he transitioned to the offensive line before the 2016 season. He started the first three games at right tackle in 2016, before being replaced. Leonard regained his starting role for the final three games of the season. In 2017, Leonard started all 13 games at left tackle for the Seminoles.

Professional career

New Orleans Saints
Leonard was drafted by the New Orleans Saints in the fourth round, 127th overall, of the 2018 NFL Draft. On May 10, 2018, Leonard signed his rookie contract with the Saints. He was waived on September 1, 2018 and was signed to the practice squad the next day. He was released on October 2, 2018.

Los Angeles Rams
On October 9, 2018, Leonard was signed to the Los Angeles Rams' practice squad. He was released on November 6, 2018.

Arizona Cardinals
On November 14, 2018, Leonard was signed to the Arizona Cardinals practice squad.

Houston Texans
On January 9, 2019, Leonard signed a reserve/future contract with the Houston Texans.  The Texans waived him on August 31 during final roster cuts. On September 1, 2019, Leonard was signed to the Houston Texans practice squad. He signed a reserve/future contract with the Texans on January 13, 2020.

On September 5, 2020, Leonard was waived by the Texans.

Arizona Cardinals (second stint)
On September 22, 2020, Leonard was signed to the Arizona Cardinals practice squad. He was released on October 1, 2020, and later re-signed to the practice squad on October 20. Leonard was released on November 24, 2020.

Washington Football Team 
Leonard signed with the Washington Football Team's practice squad on December 1, 2020. On January 11, 2021, Leonard signed a reserve/futures contract with Washington. He was waived/injured on August 24, 2021, and reverted to injured reserve before being waived with an injury settlement on September 2.

Atlanta Falcons
On November 18, 2021, Leonard was signed to the Atlanta Falcons practice squad. He was released on December 7.

Minnesota Vikings
On December 28, 2021, Leonard was signed to the Minnesota Vikings practice squad.

Atlanta Falcons (second stint)
On December 31, 2021, Leonard was signed by the Atlanta Falcons off the Vikings practice squad. his first career game against the Buffalo Bills on January 2, 2022. He was waived August 26, 2022  He was released on August 26, 2022.

References

External links
Florida State Seminoles bio

1996 births
Living people
American football offensive tackles
Arizona Cardinals players
Atlanta Falcons players
Florida State Seminoles football players
Houston Texans players
Los Angeles Rams players
Minnesota Vikings players
New Orleans Saints players
People from Middletown, Maryland
Players of American football from Maryland
Sportspeople from the Washington metropolitan area
Washington Football Team players